Inglis County is one of the 141 Cadastral divisions of New South Wales. It contains Tamworth and Bendemeer.

Inglis County was named in honour of Major-General, Sir John Eardley Wilmot Inglis (1814-1862).

Parishes within this county
A full list of parishes found within this county; their current LGA and mapping coordinates to the approximate centre of each location is as follows:

References

Counties of New South Wales